Podocarpus purdieanus is a species of conifer in the family Podocarpaceae. It is endemic to Jamaica. Its common name is yacca, or St. Ann yacca.

This tree makes valuable lumber, so it has been overharvested, resulting in its current fragmented population that is limited to central Jamaica. It grows in dense forest on limestone. It can be found amongst species such as Terminalia latifolia, Cedrela odorata, Calophyllum jacquinii, and Pithecellobium alexandri.

The wood from this tree was especially good for building ship masts and the smaller trees are still used to make yam sticks. Other threats include mining, particularly of bauxite, and clearing of forest habitat for plantations and settlements.

References

purdieanus
Endangered plants
Endemic flora of Jamaica
Taxonomy articles created by Polbot
Plants described in 1844